Kenel is a surname. Notable people with the surname include:

Sandra Kenel (born 1973), Swiss fencer
Vasily Kenel (1834–1893), Russian architect

See also
Kenel, South Dakota
Kenen